The Far Eastern University – Institute of Accounts, Business, and Finance, or simply IABF, is the academic institute offering accountancy and business programs of the Far Eastern University. It is regarded as the oldest institute of the university, established prior to the creation of FEU.

The Commission on Higher Education (CHED) accredited its Business Administration program as a Center of Development since 2015; while the BSBA and Accountancy programs are certified by the ASEAN University Network-Quality Assurance (AUN-QA) and granted Level IV status by the Philippine Association of Colleges and Universities Commission on Accreditation (PACUCOA).

Brief history 
The Institute of Accounts, Business, and Finance actually predates the Far Eastern University, being established as a private institution in Manila years before the merger.

Started from a dream of having an exclusive accounting school for Filipinos, Dr. Nicanor Reyes Sr., then head of the Department of Economics at the University of the Philippines, left his position to follow this dream. With a number of prominent educators from the UP, he founded the Institute of Accountancy in 1928. Upon branching out to other fields related to accountancy such as economics, business management, and finance, the institute was renamed as the Institute of Accounts, Business, and Finance a year later, in 1929.

In 1933, Dr. Reyes would gain control over the stocks of the Far Eastern College, another institution in Manila, established by Don Vicente Fabella in 1919. Dr. Reyes  then merged it with the IABF, giving birth to the Far Eastern University. IABF would continue to operate as an academic institute under the university, being its flagship institute. It was also then decided that FEU's colleges would bear the title "Institute".

Through the years, IABF would be hailed as one of the largest business school in the country. Having innovative ways to modernize the curriculum, FEU would produce a high rate of business and accountancy graduates, consistent top-notchers in the CPA Board exams, and a list of distinguished alumni.

Degree programs

Undergraduate programs 

 Bachelor of Science in Accountancy
 Bachelor of Science in Business Administration
 Bachelor of Science in Internal Auditing

Graduate programs 

 Master in Business Administration

Notable alumni 

 Henry Sy, Sr. - Founder of SM Investments
 Ramon Sy, Sr. - Former Vice President of the Asia United Bank (AUB)
 Menardo Jimenez - Former GMA Network President
 Feliciano Miranda, Jr. - Former President of the Philippine National Bank (PNB)
 Benjamin Punongbayan - Founder of P&A Grant Thornton
 Alfonso Yuchengco - Former Philippine Representative to the United Nations

References 

Far Eastern University
Business schools in the Philippines